Uvasaggaharam Stotra is an adoration of the twenty-third Tīirthankara Parshvanatha. This Stotra was composed by Acharya Bhadrabahu who lived in around 2nd–4th century AD. It is believed to eliminate obstacles, hardships, and miseries, if chanted with complete faith.

‘श्रीभद्रबाहुप्रसादात् एष योग: पफलतु’

उवसग्गहरं पासं, पासं वंदामि कम्मघण-मुक्कं
विसहर-विस-निन्नासं मंगल कल्लाण आवासं   ।१।

अर्थ-प्रगाढ़ कर्म-समूह से सर्वथा मुक्त, विषधरो के विष को नाश करने वाले, मंगल और कल्याण के आवास तथा उपसर्गों को हरने वाले भगवान् पार्श्वनाथ की मैं वन्दना करता हूँ।

विसहर-फुल्लिंगमंतं कंठे धारेइ जो सया मणुओ
तस्स गह रोग मारी, दुट्ठ जरा जंति उवसामं   ।२।

अर्थ-विष को हरने वाले इस मंत्रारूपी स्पुफलिंग (ज्योतिपुंज) को जो मनुष्य सदैव अपने कंठ में धारण करता है, उस व्यक्ति के दुष्ट ग्रह, रोग, बीमारी, दुष्ट शत्रु एवं बुढ़ापे के दु:ख शांत हो जाते हैं।

चिट्ठउ दूरे मंतो, तुज्झ पणामो वि बहुफलो होइ 
नर तिरियेसु वि जीवा, पावंति न दुक्ख-दोगच्चं  ।३।

अर्थ-हे भगवन्! आपके इस विषहर मंत्रा की बात तो दूर रहे, मात्रा आपको प्रणाम करना भी बहुत फल देने वाला होता है। उससे मनुष्य और तिर्यंच गतियों में रहने वाले जीव भी दु:ख और दुर्गति को प्राप्त नहीं करते हैं।

तुह सम्मत्ते लद्धे चिंतामणि कप्प-पायव-ब्भहिए 
पावंति अविग्घेणं जीवा अयरामरं ठाणं  ।४।

अर्थ-वे व्यक्ति आपको भलिभाँति प्राप्त करने पर, मानो चिंतामणि और कल्पवृक्ष को पा लेते हैं, और वे जीव बिना किसी विघ्न के अजर, अमर पद मोक्ष को प्राप्त करते हैं।

इह संथुओ महायस भत्तिब्भर निब्भरेण हिअएण 
ता देव! दिज्ज बोहिं, भवे-भवे पास जिणचंद   ।५।

अर्थ-हे महान् यशस्वी ! मैं इस लोक में भक्ति से भरे हुए हृदय से आपकी स्तुति करता हूँ। हे देव! जिनचन्द्र पार्श्वनाथ ! आप मुझे प्रत्येक भव में बोधि (रत्नत्रय) प्रदान करें।

ॐ-अमरतरु-कामधेणु-चिंतामणि-कामकुंभमादिया 
सिरि पासणाह सेवाग्गहणे सव्वे वि दासत्तं  ।६।

अर्थ-श्री पार्श्वनाथ भगवान् की सेवा ग्रहण कर लेने पर ओम्, कल्पवृक्ष, कामधेनु, चिंतामणि रत्न, इच्छापूर्ति करने वाला कलश आदि सभी सुखप्रदाता कारण उस व्यक्ति के दासत्व को प्राप्त हो जाते हैं।

उवसग्गहरं त्थोत्तं कादूणं जेण संघ कल्लाणं 
करुणायरेण विहिदं स भद्दबाहु गुरु जयदु  ।७।

अर्थ-जिन करुणाकर आचार्य भद्रबाहु के द्वारा संघ के कल्याणकारक यह ‘उपसर्गहर स्तोत्र’ निर्मित किया गया है, वे गुरु भद्रबाहु सदा जयवन्त हों।

See also

 Bhadrabahu
 Padmavati (Jainism)
 Dharanendra
 Shree Uvasaggahar Stotra Meaning
 Shree Uvasaggahar Stotra Video
 Shree Uvasaggahar Stotra Books

References

Citations

Sources
 

Jain mantras
Jain texts